Joan Lea Bybee (previously: Hooper; born 11 February 1945 in New Orleans, Louisiana) is an American linguist and professor emerita at the University of New Mexico. Much of her work concerns grammaticalization, stochastics, modality, morphology, and phonology. Bybee is best known for proposing the theory of usage-based phonology and for her contributions to cognitive and historical linguistics.

Contributions to linguistic theory 
Bybee's earliest work in linguistics was framed within a Generative perspective, the dominant theoretical approach to phonology at the time. As her career developed, Bybee's contributions moved progressively from formalist theories towards a functional and cognitive perspective, incorporating insights from morphology, semantics, syntax, child language acquisition and historical linguistics.

Generative work (1970s)

Natural Generative Phonology 
In the early and mid-70's, Bybee proposed that the connection between the abstract phonological representation of a word and the actual forms experienced by language users was a more direct one than previously postulated. Her theory of Natural Generative Phonology, elaborated upon and expanded the work of Theo Vennemann, proposing less abstract mental representations of sound structure while arguing for greater proximity between phonetic and phonological forms.

Although belonging to a formalist tradition, Bybee's early work already contained elements that challenged the performance/competence model that underlay all Generative assumptions. Natural Generative Phonology proposed that the mental representation of language results from speakers’ exposure to actual language in use. The proposal that the structure of language derives from actual communication rather than from abstract rules wired in the brain represented a major departure from the mainstream linguistics, an idea Bybee pursued in all her subsequent work.

Morphology 
In 1985, Bybee published her influential volume Morphology: A study of the Relation between Meaning and Form, in which she uncovered semantic regularities across 50 genetically and geographically diverse languages. These meaning similarities manifest themselves in recurring cross-linguistic patterns in morphological systems with respect to tense, aspect and mood. This work runs counter to Chomskyan generative theory, which describes grammar as an independent module of the brain that works in an abstract manner completely detached from semantic considerations.

Cognitive linguistics 
Alongside linguists Dan Slobin and Carol Moder, Bybee's work helped popularize the concept of mental schemas (or schemata) to explain grammatical structure, especially in terms of connections between morphological forms within a paradigm. Bybee defines schemas as "an emergent generalization over words having similar patterns of semantic and phonological connections". For instance, the English irregular verbs snuck, struck, strung, spun and hung are connected through a schema that builds on similarities between these verbs and across the lexicon: the meaning of past tense, the vowel [ʌ],  the final nasal and/or (sequence of) velar consonants, as well as the initial fricative consonant /s/ or /h/.

Connections between individual forms and schemas exist in a network (see below) whose links can be strengthened, weakened and at times also severed or created. According to Bybee, the force that binds the links in a network is actual language usage.

The Network Model 
Informed by studies child language development, morphological change and psycholinguistic experimentation, Bybee proposed in the late 1980s and early 1990s a model to account for the cognitive representation of morphologically complex words: the Network Model. Words entered in the lexicon have varying degrees of lexical strength, due primarily to their token frequency. Words with high lexical strength are easy to access, serve as the bases of morphological relations and exhibit an autonomy that makes them resistant to change and prone to semantic independence.

Grammaticalization 
Diachronic studies figure prominently in Bybee's body of work. Specifically, her work has explored the ways in which grammar emerges through language use via grammaticalization. Grammaticalization describes the concept that individual words or constructions may come to express abstract grammatical meaning (e.g. future tense) as users increasingly pair frequent words with a given meaning.

Honors 
Bybee served as president of the Linguistic Society of America in 2004. She was named a Fellow of the Linguistic Society of America in 2006.

Key publications 
Hooper, Joan B. 1976. An Introduction to Natural Generative Phonology.  New York: Academic Press.
Bybee, Joan L. 1985. Morphology: A Study of the Relation between Meaning and Form.  Amsterdam: John Benjamins. (Korean translation by Seongha Rhee and Hyun Jung Koo. Seoul: Hankook Publishing Company, 2000.)
Bybee, Joan, Revere Perkins and William Pagliuca. 1994. The Evolution of Grammar: Tense, Aspect and Modality in the Languages of the World. Chicago: University of Chicago Press.
Bybee, Joan. 2001. Phonology and Language Use. Cambridge: Cambridge University Press.
Bybee, Joan. 2005. "Language change and universals" in Linguistic Universals, edited by Ricardo Mairal and Juana Gil. Cambridge: Cambridge University Press.
Bybee, Joan. 2006. Frequency of Use and the Organization of Language. Oxford: Oxford University Press.
Bybee, Joan. 2010. Language, Usage and Cognition. Cambridge: Cambridge University Press.
Bybee, Joan. 2015. Language Change. Cambridge: Cambridge University Press.
Joan Lea Bybee: "Irrealis" as a Grammatical Category. Anthropological linguistics 40 NO. 2 (1998), pp. 257–271

References

External links 
 Homepage
 Biographical information. omnilexica.com

Linguists from the United States
Living people
Women linguists
Morphologists
University of New Mexico faculty
University of Texas at Austin alumni
San Diego State University alumni
University of California, Los Angeles alumni
Fellows of the Cognitive Science Society
1945 births
Linguistic Society of America presidents
Fellows of the Linguistic Society of America